Roy A. Tucker (1951 - 2021) was an American astronomer best known for the co-discovery of near-Earth asteroid 99942 Apophis (formerly known as ) along with David J. Tholen and Fabrizio Bernardi of the University of Hawaii. He was a prolific discoverer of minor planets, credited by the Minor Planet Center with the discovery of 702 numbered minor planets between 1996 and 2010. He also discovered two comets: 328P/LONEOS–Tucker and C/2004 Q1, a Jupiter-family and near-parabolic comet, respectively.

Biography

Tucker was raised in Memphis, Tennessee. In 1966, he became a member of Memphis Astronomical Society and received a master's degree in Scientific Instrumentation from the University of California, Santa Barbara. He worked as a senior engineer in the Imaging Technology Laboratory of the University of Arizona and as an instrumentalist at Kitt Peak National Observatory. He observed and discovered minor planets at his private Goodricke-Pigott Observatory in southern Arizona.

Recognition

In 2002, he was one of five researchers awarded a "Gene Shoemaker Near Earth Object Grant", by the Planetary Society.

The main-belt asteroid 10914 Tucker, discovered by Paul Comba in 1997, was named in his honor.

List of discovered minor planets

References

Further reading 

 Aguirre, Edwin L. 1999. Sentinel of the Sky - Armed with a Modest Telescope and CCD Camera, Tucson Amateur Roy A Tucker Joins the Ranks of Professional Astronomers Who Have Discovered Near-Earth Objects. Sky and Telescope. 97, no. 3: 76. 
 CCD Precision Photometry Workshop, Eric R. Craine, Roy A. Tucker, Jeannette V. Barnes. CCD Precision Photometry Workshop: Proceedings of a Meeting Held at San Diego, California, USA, 6-7, June 1998. Astronomical Society of the Pacific conference series, v. 189. San Francisco, Calif: Astronomical Society of the Pacific, 1999.

External links 
 Goodricke-Pigott Observatory 
 Discovering My First Asteroid "Don't count your asteroids till they are numbered" - Roy A. Tucker First person narrative.

1951 births
American astronomers
Discoverers of asteroids
Discoverers of comets

Living people
People from Jackson, Mississippi
University of Arizona
University of California, Santa Barbara alumni